Hamengkubuwono IV, also spelled Hamengkubuwana IV (Yogyakarta, April 3, 1804 – Yogyakarta, December 6, 1823) was the fourth sultan of Yogyakarta, Indonesia, reigning from 1814 to 1823.

Reign
Born as Gusti Raden Mas Ibnu Jarot, he was the 18th son of Hamengkubuwono III, born from his queen consort, Gusti Kanjeng Ratu Kencono. He was the younger half brother of Prince Diponegoro.  He succeeded his father when he was 10 years old. Due to his young age, Paku Alam I was appointed as his regent.

His reign was a period of political deterioration that ultimately led up to the Java War. In his era, Patih Danureja IV acted violently and arbitrarily. He put his relatives in many court's important position. This pro-Dutch Danurejan family also supported the implementation of land rent system for private entrepreneurs, which inflicted a loss upon the poor subjects.

In January 20, 1820, Paku Alam I gave up his position as sultan's regent. Hamengkubuwono IV's independent rule was only 2 years due to his sudden death on December 6, 1823, when he was on vacation, hence his posthumous title, Sinuhun Jarot, Seda Besiyar.

Upon his premature death, rumours circulated that he had been poisoned. His three-year-old son, Hamengkubuwana V, ascended the throne amid controversy over who would act as regent. Hamengkubuwono V was later succeeded by his brother, styled Hamengkubuwono VI.

Family
In total, Hamengkubuwono IV had 1 queen consort, 8 concubines, and 13 children.

His only queen consort was Raden Ajeng Sepuh, also known as GKR. Kencana/Ageng (born 1802), daughter of Patih Danureja II and Kanjeng Ratu Angga, daughter of Hamengkubuwono II, and had:
 Kanjeng Gusti Pangeran Adipati Anom Mangkunegara Sudibya Rajaputra Narendra ing Mataram (September – December 1817)
 Gusti Raden Mas Gatot Menol (later Hamengkubuwono V)
 GRM. Mustaja (later Hamengkubuwono VI)
 GKR. Sekarkedhaton (born 1822), died young.

His concubines included:
 Bendara Raden Ayu Dewaningrum, and had:
 BRM. Tritustha, died young.
 BRM. Sunadi, died young.
 2 other sons who died in childhood.
 BRAy. Murcitaningrum, and had:
 Bendara Raden Ayu Gusti Maduretna, married to Kanjeng Pangeran Harya Yudhanegara I alias Kanjeng Raden Tumenggung Prawiradirja.
 BRAy. Ratna Adiningrum, and had:
 BRAy. Danureja, married with KRT. Gandakusuma/Kanjeng Raden Adipati Danureja IV.
 BRAy. Turunsi, and had:
 BRAy. Nitinegara, married with KRT. Nitinegara II, son of KRT. Nitinegara I (a son-in-law of Hamengkubuwono II).
 BRAy. Dayaasmara, and had:
 Bendara Pangeran Harya Panengah/Hangabehi/Suryadiningrat, a KNIL officer.
 BRAy. Murtiningrum, widow of his father, Hamengkubuwono III, and had:
 BRAy. Jayaningrat
 Bendara Raden Ajeng Mutoinah.
 BRAy. Ratnaningrum, and had:
 BRAy. Suryaatmaja
 BRM. Samadikun
 BRAy. Widyawati, daughter of Kyai Dalang Jiwatenaya, a wayang kulit puppeteer, and had:
 BPH. Mlayakusuma/Suryanegara (1822–1886), a KNIL officer and Javanese poet.
 BRM. Pirngadi, died young.

Notes

Literature
 Purwadi. 2007. Sejarah Raja-Raja Jawa. Yogyakarta: Media Ilmu.

Sultans of Yogyakarta
Burials at Imogiri
1804 births
1823 deaths
Indonesian royalty